Guanlong (冠龍) is a genus of extinct proceratosaurid tyrannosauroid dinosaur from the Late Jurassic of China. The taxon was first described in 2006 by Xu Xing et al., who found it to represent a new taxon related to Tyrannosaurus. The name is derived from Chinese, translating as "crown dragon". Two individuals are currently known, a partially complete adult and a nearly complete juvenile. These specimens come from the Oxfordian stage of the Chinese Shishugou Formation.

Discovery

Guanlong was discovered in the Dzungaria area of China by a joint expedition by scientists from the Institute of Vertebrate Paleontology and Paleoanthropology and George Washington University, and named by Xu Xing and others in 2006. Guanlong comes from the Chinese words for "crown", 冠, and "dragon", 龍, referring to the crest. The specific epithet (五彩), wucaii (Hanyu Pinyin: wǔcǎi), means "multicoloured" and refers to the colours of rock of the Wucaiwan (五彩灣, "5-colored bay", "multicolored bay"), the multi-hued badlands where the creature was found.

At present, Guanlong is known from two specimens, one discovered on top of the other, with three other individual theropod dinosaurs, in the Shishugou Formation. The holotype (IVPP V14531) is a reasonably complete, partially articulated adult skeleton, and was the one on top. Another, immature specimen, the paratype IVPP V14532, is known from fully articulated and nearly complete remains. It was presumed to have been trampled, after death, by the adult. The crest on the skull of the immature specimen is notably smaller and restricted to the forward portion of the snout, while the adult has a larger and more extensive crest. The crests of both specimens are thin, delicate structures that likely served as display organs, possibly for events like mating.

Description

Its fossils were found in the Shishugou Formation dating to about 160 million years ago, in the Oxfordian stage of the Late Jurassic period, 92 million years before its well-known relative Tyrannosaurus. This bipedal saurischian theropod shared many traits with its descendants, and also had some unusual ones, like a large crest on its head. Unlike later tyrannosaurs, Guanlong had three long fingers on its hands. Aside from its distinctive crest, it would have resembled its close relative Dilong, and like Dilong may have had a coat of primitive feathers.

Classification

In a recent study, Guanlong was found to be in a clade with both Proceratosaurus and Kileskus. Together they formed the family Proceratosauridae with a clade containing Sinotyrannus, Juratyrant and Stokesosaurus. However, in 2014 another study was published, instead finding Stokesosaurus and Juratyrant outside the family, which only included Guanlong, Proceratosaurus, Kileskus and Sinotyrannus.

Below is a simplified cladogram of the later analysis, from Fiorillo & Tykoski, 2014.

Paleobiology

The age of the two individuals were determined using a histological analysis. The adult was shown to have matured at 7 years of age, and died at the age of 12. The juvenile died at 6, and was still growing. As the individuals are different ages, it can be seen some of the changes that happened during growth. In the juvenile, the crest is restricted to the snout, which is proportionally shorter. The orbit is also larger, the hand comparatively larger, the lower leg is longer, the pubic bone has a less expanded end, and other features found in more derived coelurosaurs and tyrannosauroids.

Guanlong possessed a cranial crest, which may have been used for display. It is similar to those of Dilophosaurus and Monolophosaurus, and like those it was highly pneumatized. However, it was more delicate than in the other genera, and also proportionately larger and more elaborate. Structures in Dilophosaurus and Monolophosaurus have also been suggested to be for species recognition, but the more gracile crest of Guanlong is more likely for display purposes.

See also

 Timeline of tyrannosaur research

References

External links
Pictures of newly discovered tyrannosaur
(BBC News), "Oldest T. rex relative unveiled" 8 February 2006
(National Geographic), "Tyrannosaur Trap" July 2008 Accessed 17 June 2008

Proceratosaurids
Oxfordian life
Late Jurassic dinosaurs of Asia
Jurassic China
Fossils of China
Paleontology in Xinjiang
Fossil taxa described in 2006
Taxa named by Xu Xing